Abramová is a village and municipality in Turčianske Teplice District in the Žilina Region of northern central Slovakia.

History
In historical records the village was first mentioned in 1400. Traditionally, it is a small village. Around year 1900, it had between 70 and 100 inhabitants, with the lowest state reaching during the 1980s, when it had only 29 people.

Geography
It has a population of about 170 people (2006).

Genealogical resources

The records for genealogical research are available at the state archive "State Archive in Bytča, Slovakia"

 Roman Catholic church records (births/marriages/deaths): 1679-1895
 Lutheran church records (births/marriages/deaths): 1715-1895
 Census records 1869 of Abramova are not available at the state archive.

See also
 List of municipalities and towns in Slovakia

References

External links
Surnames of living people in Abramova

Villages and municipalities in Turčianske Teplice District